Isla Bartolomé  is an uninhabited subantarctic island. Administratively it belongs to Chile.

Geography and ecology
With an area of 93 ha and a maximum height of  it is the largest of the Diego Ramírez Archipelago, being more than twice the size of the second largest - Isla Gonzalo, lying in the Drake Passage between the continents of South America and Antarctica.  It is an important breeding site for black-browed (over 35,000 pairs) and grey-headed (over 9000 pairs) albatrosses, as well as for southern giant petrels.

See also 
 List of Antarctic and sub-Antarctic islands

References

Uninhabited islands of Chile
Islands of Magallanes Region
Diego Ramírez Islands
Seabird colonies